Ramón Torres Martínez (November 22, 1924 - September 4, 2008) was a Mexican architect.

His 1950s designs were influenced by the Bauhaus movement. Together with Héctor Velázquez Moreno he founded the architecture bureau Torres y Velázquez Arquitectos y Asociados, and was director of the Faculty of Architecture of the Universidad Nacional Autónoma de México (UNAM). He co-designed Plaza Jacaranda shopping center in Zona Rosa, Mexico City, opened in 1957.

Awards 
 2005 Premio Nacional de Arquitectura
 2007 "Antonio Attolini Lack" medal
 2007 Honor award, "Iconos de Diseño", Architectural Digest México

References

External links 
 

Mexican architects
Academic staff of the National Autonomous University of Mexico
People from Toluca
1924 births
2008 deaths